Christine Stephen or Christina Stevens may refer to:

 Christine Stephen-Daly (born 1973), Australian actress
 Christine Stephens, New Zealand psychologist
 Christina Stevens (1825–1876), Dutch missionary

See also
 Marie Christie Stevens, namesake of the U.S. Navy ship USS Stevens
Christine Stevens (disambiguation)
 Chris Stevens (disambiguation)
 Steven Christian (disambiguation)